Brock is a two-part Australian miniseries based on the life of motor racing driver Peter Brock which premiered on Network Ten on 9 October 2016 & concluding on 10 October 2016.

Synopsis
The series charts the highs of Peter Brock's motor racing career and the lows of his personal life. It covers his action packed career and his association with Holden for almost 40 years including a public split involving the controversial device the Energy Polariser. The controversy followed in his personal life with three marriages, many affairs and accusations of domestic violence.

Cast
 Matthew Le Nevez as Peter Brock
 Ella Scott Lynch as Beverly Brock
 Brendan Cowell as Allan Moffat
 Natalie Bassingthwaighte as Julie Bamford
 Steve Bisley as Harry Firth
 Ryan Johnson as Tim "Plastic" Pemberton
 Ben Hall as Phil Brock
 Nadia Townsend as Pauline Moffat
 Henry Nixon as Shane Barry
 Kirsty Lee Allan as Michelle Downes
 Martin Sacks as Geoff Brock
 Axle Whitehead as Colin Bond
 Alex Williams as John "Slug" Harvey
 Salvatore Coco as Jack "Peanut" Freebody
 Ryan O'Kane as Dennis Sutcliff
 Brad McMurray as Al Turner
 Robert Mammone as Dr. Eric Dowker

Episodes

References

External links
 
 

2010s Australian television miniseries
Australian television series
Australian auto racing films
Network 10 original programming